Toasty or Toastie may refer to:

 Toasty (wine), a wine tasting descriptor
 Toastie, a sandwich made in a pie iron
 Toasty: Ashes of Dusk, a role-playing video game scheduled for release in 2023
 "Toasty!", a Dan Forden catchphrase first heard in Mortal Kombat II
 Post Toasties, a breakfast cereal

See also
 Toast (disambiguation)